The 1962 Texas Longhorns football team represented the University of Texas at Austin during the 1962 NCAA University Division football season.

Schedule

Awards and honors
Johnny Treadwell, Guard, Cotton Bowl co-Most Valuable Player
Johnny Treadwell, Consensus All-American

References

Texas
Texas Longhorns football seasons
Southwest Conference football champion seasons
Texas Longhorns football